Elmhurst is an unincorporated community in Langlade County, Wisconsin, United States. It is in the town of Rolling at latitude 45°3'30" North, longitude 89°11'3" West. The community is located near the headwaters of the Middle Branch Embarrass River, approximately 1½ miles west of the junction of WIS 47, WIS 52 and U.S. Highway 45 in the Town of Rolling. A track of the Chicago and North Western Railway runs along the west side of the community.

History
A post office called Elmhurst was established in 1881, and remained in operation until it was discontinued in 1928. The community was named after Elmhurst, Illinois.

Notes

Unincorporated communities in Langlade County, Wisconsin
Unincorporated communities in Wisconsin